Lamezia Terme International Airport  is an airport in the Sant'Eufemia district of Lamezia Terme, Calabria, Italy. It is the principal airport of Calabria. Additionally, a military helicopter unit, the 2° Reggimento dell'Aria "Sirio", is based near the airport.

History

In 1965, a consortium, CONSAER, was formed to build a new airport near the motorway, the railway and the port of Gioia Tauro; level ground near Lamezia Terme was chosen as the site. The airport opened in June 1976. Its IATA airport code SUF derives from the name Sant'Eufemia. Itavia began scheduled flights to Rome-Fiumicino, Milan-Linate, Catania and Palermo in December of that year. The airport was expanded and modernised in 1982.

Since 1990 it has been managed by SACAL SpA, which is jointly owned by various local government administrations and by private investors.

A contract to extend the runway from the current 2,414 m to 3,000 m was awarded on 27 December 2007. A design competition for a new passenger terminal to replace the present building was held in November 2008, and was won by Engco.

Airlines and destinations
The following airlines operate regular scheduled and charter flights at Lamezia Terme Airport:

Statistics

References

External links

 Official Homepage from Società Aeroportuale Calabrese
 

Lamezia Terme
Airport
Buildings and structures in the Province of Catanzaro